This is a comprehensive listing of official releases by Jenny Lewis, lead singer of the band Rilo Kiley.

Albums

Studio albums

Collaborative albums

Live albums

Singles

Collaborative singles

Music videos

Soundtracks

Contributions

Film score composer

Guest appearances and collaborations

Rilo Kiley

Take-Offs and Landings (2001)
The Execution of All Things (2002)
More Adventurous (2004)
Under the Blacklight (2007)

See also
 Rilo Kiley
 Rilo Kiley discography
 Blake Sennett
 The Elected
 The Postal Service

References

Discographies of American artists
Rock music discographies